Togetherland was originally intended to be Seal's fourth album and was to be released in 2001.

The tracks were originally written and recorded at Seal's home studio in Los Angeles in 1999. Songwriters Guy Gershoni and Dave Palmer were brought in at two-week intervals for eight months of intensive collaboration efforts. The outcome of these writing sessions were experimental, edgy, underground club tracks reflective of Seal's early career and roots. Such a divergence from the Seal brand today, that there was discussion about releasing the tracks under a pseudo-name, as not to disrupt or confuse Seal's established fan base. Henry Jackman was contracted to produce and help create a mainstream sounding album, before it was presented to the label. These are the versions that are sampled online. Contrary to various reports, Warner Bros. Records turned down the album due to their dissatisfaction with the final record. Seal decided to record and release Seal IV in its place. He then put Togetherland into a "vault", where the album has remained since.

Over the years, fans have been able to listen to 30-second clips as well as streamed, full versions of some of the album's songs, to which many of those songs received high praise. On July 1, 2007, a book titled The Greatest Music Never Sold was released and makes mention of Togetherland as well as other popular artists whose music has been kept hidden away. The original versions have not been leaked to the public.

The only song from Togetherland to be released commercially is "This Could Be Heaven" (originally entitled simply "Heaven"), which was featured on the soundtrack of the motion picture The Family Man. The recording of the track, however, is different from the version that was recorded for Togetherland.. As well, the song "Whatever You Need", released as one of two bonus tracks on Seal 7 : {Deluxe Edition}, is also a slightly different and retitled version of the Togetherland track Breathe.

Track listing
"(Just a) Step Away"
"Keep On" (Original title "Champagne")
"Love Is Better"
"Elise"
"Under the Sun"
"Heaven"
"English Lover" (Duet with Emiliana Torrini)
"Breathe"
"All I Wanted to Say"
"Let It Ride"
"Togetherland"

References 

Seal (musician) albums
Unreleased albums
2001 albums